The Parish Church of All Saints is an active Church of England parish church in the town of Gainsborough, West Lindsey, Lincolnshire, England. It was rebuilt in the 18th century, between 1736 and 1744, with only the 14th-century tower of the former church being kept. The design is attributed to Francis Smith of Warwick.

The church is located on Church Street, near to the town centre and the church is the main parish church of the town.

References

Grade I listed churches in Lincolnshire
Churches completed in 1744
Gainsborough, Lincolnshire